This is a list of the current and former Philippine presidents by previous executive experience before they became president of the Philippines. Executive experience is defined as having been something where one is the top decision-maker in a company, a regional constituency, a military unit, or something similar. Positions like Army General, Governor, Vice Governor, Mayor, Vice Mayor, Vice President of the Philippines, and Chief Executive Officer are included, but not limited to just that.

Philippines
Previous executive experience, List of Philippine Presidents by